Henry Williams Dwight (February 26, 1788 – February 21, 1845) was a lawyer and politician who became U.S. Representative from Massachusetts.

Life
Born February 26, 1788 in Stockbridge, Massachusetts, his father was also named Henry Williams Dwight  (1757–1804) and mother was Abigail Welles (1763–1840). His grandfather was Joseph Dwight (1703–1765), and mother traced her ancestry to Thomas Welles (1590–1659).
Dwight was a trustee of Williams College in Williamstown, Massachusetts from 1829-1837.
He was admitted to the Massachusetts bar in 1809 and practiced in Stockbridge.
During the War of 1812 Dwight served as aide-de-camp with the rank of colonel on the staff of General Whiton, and kept the title colonel for the rest of his life.
He served as member of the Massachusetts State house of representatives in 1818.

Dwight was elected as a Federalist to the Seventeenth Congress starting on March 4, 1821.
He was reelected as an Adams-Clay Federalist to the Eighteenth Congress.

Dwight was elected as an Adams candidate to the Nineteenth and Twentieth Congresses.
Dwight was reelected as an Anti-Jacksonian to the Twenty-first Congress until March 3, 1831.
He was not a candidate for renomination in 1830 to the Twenty-second Congress.
He was again a member of the State house of representatives in 1834.

He received an honorary degree from William College, and as a trustee nominated Mark Hopkins as a replacement professor in 1830.
He bred purebred sheep, horses, and cattle. He married Frances Fowler (1797–after 1874) on November 10, 1824. They had one daughter who died young, and two sons. Henry Williams Dwight, 3rd was born September 23, 1825, and died May 16, 1861.
James Fowler Dwight was born January 30, 1830, joined the Union Army in the American Civil War and rose to rank of colonel. 
Dwight died in New York City on February 21, 1845.
He was interred in Stockbridge Cemetery, Stockbridge, Massachusetts.

See also
 New England Dwight family

References

1788 births
1845 deaths
People from Stockbridge, Massachusetts
United States Army officers
Federalist Party members of the United States House of Representatives from Massachusetts
Massachusetts National Republicans
Williams College alumni
National Republican Party members of the United States House of Representatives
19th-century American politicians
Military personnel from Massachusetts